Kōhoku Station may refer to:
 Kōhoku Station (Aichi) in Nagoya, Japan
 Kōhoku Station (Saga) in Saga, Japan
 Kōhoku Station (Tokyo) in Tokyo, Japan